Augusto Tomás Álvarez (born August 1, 1984) is an Argentine footballer who played for teams in Chile and Peru as well as in his native Argentina.

Titles
 Cobresal 2015 (Chilean First División Championship)

References
 
 

1984 births
Living people
Argentine footballers
Argentine expatriate footballers
Cobresal footballers
Chilean Primera División players
Expatriate footballers in Chile
Footballers from Santa Fe, Argentina
Association football defenders